Interferon alpha-17 is a protein that in humans is encoded by the IFNA17 gene.

References

Further reading